The Virginia High-Tech Partnership (VHTP) is an educational consortium that links students from Virginia's five Historically Black Colleges and Universities with corporations, high-tech firms and government agencies for internships, summer positions and career opportunities.

Participation
The following universities participate in the partnership:

Hampton University
Norfolk State University
Saint Paul's College
Virginia State University
Virginia Union University

More than 3,000 students in these schools major in technology, mathematics and science degree programs.

External links
 Official website
 VHTP annual job fairs

Education in Virginia
-